Hucknall Rolls Leisure Football Club was a football club based in Hucknall, Nottinghamshire, England.

Rolls-Royce Welfare F.C. were formed in 1935 when Rolls's Hucknall factory first opened its gates. Dissolved and reformed in the 1970s, they were renamed as Hucknall Rolls-Royce F.C. in 1991, before a further change to Rolls-Royce Leisure F.C. in 2002. The club again dissolved and reformed in 2009, this time emerging as Hucknall Rolls Leisure F.C.. The club folded again in 2016.

The club played in the Nottinghamshire Senior League from 1991 to 1997 and the Central Midlands Football League from 1997 to 2009, before re-joining the Nottinghamshire Senior League after re-forming in 2009. In the 2002–03 season, the club reached the First Round of the FA Vase.

They played on the same road, Watnall Road as Hucknall Town, but approximately a mile further from the town centre.

References

External links
 
 
 

Defunct football clubs in England
Defunct football clubs in Nottinghamshire
Association football clubs disestablished in 2009
1935 establishments in England
2009 disestablishments in England
2014 establishments in England
Central Midlands Football League
2016 disestablishments in England
Association football clubs disestablished in 2016
Nottinghamshire Senior League
Association football clubs established in 1935
Association football clubs established in 2009
Works association football teams in England